Line 5 of the Hangzhou Metro is a subway line in Hangzhou. The line is colored cyan on system maps.

Opening timeline

Stations

Line 5 runs from Jinxing and Guniangqiao. The western terminus, Guniangqiao, is an interchange with Shaoxing Metro Line 1. In the future, there will be an expansion to Yuxiong Academy School and Fangquan, changing Shaoxing Metro Line 1 stations in the main line to Line 5.

Legend
 - Operational
 - Under construction

Description
A , two station extension west to Laoyuhang station in Yuhang District started construction in 2018.

Rolling stock
The line uses higher capacity six car Type AH trains which are 20 cm wider than the Type B trains used in other Hangzhou Metro lines, increasing capacity by about 10%.

Planning
The eastern and western extensions to Yuxiong Academy School and Fangquan, merges Line 1 of Shaoxing Metro's system to Line 5 of Hangzhou's metro system.

See also
 Hangzhou Metro
 Shaoxing Metro

References

05
MTR Corporation
Railway lines opened in 2019
2019 establishments in China
Standard gauge railways in China